Girl Talk is the first full-length album by Holly Cole and her trio. It was released in 1990 on Alert Records in Canada.

Track listing
 "My Foolish Heart" (Ned Washington, Victor Young) – 4:34
 "Girl Talk" (Neal Hefti, Bobby Troup) – 4:32
 "Talk to Me Baby" (Robert E. Dolan, Johnny Mercer) – 4:33
 "Cruisin'" – 4:40
 "Spring Can Really Hang You up the Most" (Fran Landesman, Tommy Wolf) – 4:40
 "My Baby Just Cares for Me" (Walter Donaldson, Gus Kahn) – 4:25
 "How Long Has This Been Going On?" (George Gershwin, Ira Gershwin) – 5:55
 "I'm So Lonesome I Could Cry" (Hank Williams) – 4:24
 "My Melancholy Baby" (Ernie Burnett, George A. Norton) – 5:03
 "Downtown" (Tony Hatch) – 3:55

Personnel
 Holly Cole - vocals
 Aaron Davis - piano
 David Piltch - double bass
 John Johnson - saxophone on "Cruisin'"
 John MacLeod - trumpet on "I'm So Lonesome I Could Cry"

References

1990 albums
Alert Records albums
Holly Cole albums